Wagner Machado da Silva, also commonly known as Wagner da Silva, or simply as Wagner (born 1 February 1961), is a Brazilian former professional basketball player.

National team career
With the senior Brazilian national basketball team, da Silva competed at the 1980 Summer Olympics.

References

1961 births
Living people
Basketball players at the 1980 Summer Olympics
Brazilian men's basketball players
Esporte Clube Sírio basketball players
Franca Basquetebol Clube players
Olympic basketball players of Brazil
Small forwards
Sport Club Corinthians Paulista basketball players
Basketball players from São Paulo